Michael Lavine (born October 13, 1963, San Francisco) is a portrait photographer based in New York City. He grew up in Denver, and graduated from Denver's South High School in 1981.

After graduating high school, Lavine headed to the Pacific Northwest and attended The Evergreen State College in Olympia, Washington, graduating in 1985. He then moved to New York City, attending Parsons School of Design, where he received a B.F.A.

While in the state of Washington, Lavine became one of the "photographers of record" of the then nascent grunge music scene. His first work on a record was the front cover of Psycho-Head Blowout by White Zombie in 1987. His personal friendships with Kurt Cobain and other members of the group Nirvana gave him unparalleled access to create a visual record of that iconic group.  He also photographed other grunge era bands such as White Zombie, Pearl Jam, Soundgarden, Monster Magnet, Sonic Youth and The Flaming Lips. Many of his photographs from this era were compiled in a 1996 Simon & Schuster book entitled Noise From the Underground.

One of Lavine's most well known photographs is the cover for the CD Life After Death by The Notorious B.I.G., which was released fifteen days after Biggie's murder. The black-and-white photograph features Wallace (Biggie) standing alongside a black funeral hearse.  In hindsight many saw this as portending his death.  In another black-and-white photograph from the same shoot, Wallace is standing in front of row after row of headstones in a graveyard.

Since 1988, Lavine has been photographing music and entertainment performers, landscapes, politicians and artists, as well as daily American life and everyday people. His style of bold saturated colors, dynamic and extreme use of lighting, and his awareness of what works graphically and what doesn’t, have made him a sought after photographer.  He has also received awards from Communication Arts' Photography and Advertising Annual each year since 1992, as well as from American Photography, the Art Director's Club and Photo District News.

Lavine currently resides in Brooklyn neighborhood with his wife, Laurie Henzel and two daughters, Olive and Penny.

Books
Noise from the Underground: A Secret History of Alternative Rock Fireside  (November 1996) 
Wu-Tang Manual Riverhead Books (February 2005) 
Grunge (with Thurston Moore) Abrams Books (October 1, 2009)

Photographic credit
Blood, Guts and Pussy - Dwarves
Living Proof - Cher
Hello Nasty - Beastie Boys
Superjudge - Monster Magnet
Nevermind - Nirvana
In Utero - Nirvana
Life After Death  - The Notorious B.I.G.
Stankonia - Outkast
Thought 'Ya Knew - CeCe Peniston
Dial M for Motherfucker - Pussy Galore
Sugarshit Sharp - Pussy Galore
Immobilarity - Raekwon
Louder Than Love - Soundgarden
Daydream Nation - Sonic Youth
Goo - Sonic Youth
Severe Exposure - Six Finger Satellite

External links 
Michael Lavine Photography
Hip Hop Immortals
Pres Photos
Beastie Mania
Michael Lavine at Team - New York, New York - Review of Exhibitions
Team Gallery
Art in Context - Catalogued Exhibitions
Photograph for Entertainment Weekly;Scott Wolf
 Photograph for Entertainment Weekly;  Jennifer Love Hewitt

References 

Rock music photographers
Lavinem Michael
1963 births
American portrait photographers
Artists from Denver
Living people